The Sioux City Art Center began as a Works Progress Administration (WPA)  project in 1937 when the Art Center Association of Sioux City, the Sioux City Junior League, as well as other community supporters, received a grant of $3,000 to create the first art center. After the Federal Assistance Program ended in 1940, the Sioux City City Council voted to fund the Art Center and established the Board of Trustees, the City's fiscal governing board for the Art Center in 1941. It is located in Sioux City, Iowa.

History
The founders of the Sioux City Society of Fine Arts—John C. Kelly, John McHugh, W.P. Manley, T.A. Black, Alice K. Lawler and Cora E. Henderson—started the museum's exhibition and education programs. The continuity between the original Sioux City Society of Fine Arts and the later Sioux City Art Center is also apparent in the Society's mission to "promote and cultivate the fine arts, and foster art in all its branches; to promote the welfare of art in the City of Sioux City."

As the Sioux City Society of Fine Arts prospered, it decided to expand its programs and bring more exhibitions to Sioux City. On March 10, 1938, the Society of Fine Arts formally changed its name to the Art Center Association of Sioux City as part of its shift to a new, permanent exhibition and educational space created in the basement of the August Williges building at 613 Pierce Street. With the construction of this first permanent exhibition space by the Society, the Junior League, area business and local volunteers, the Sioux City Art Center was officially born. This new space became possible because of the partnership with the Federal Works Progress Administration (the WPA) in 1938.

Collection
The museum's permanent collection began in 1938 as part of the WPA grant. It focuses primarily on artists from Iowa and the greater Midwest, with a smaller collection of work by national and international artists that focuses on regional concerns with landscape.

The collection includes work by: Thomas Hart Benton, Dale Chihuly, John Steuart Curry, Salvador Dalí, John Henry, John Himmelfarb, Jun Kaneko, Käthe Kollwitz, Robert Motherwell, Charles Logasa, Claes Oldenburg, Ed Paschke, Philip Pearlstein, Bridget Riley, Jerry Uelsmann, James Abbott McNeill Whistler, and Grant Wood.

Exhibitions
In addition to exhibits of regional artists, a Blockbuster Series, initiated in 2003, has included Becoming a Nation, Art and Americana from the US Department of State and the iconic Mural by Jackson Pollock.

Grant Wood's Corn Room
The Sioux City Art Center has one of Grant Wood's Corn Room murals . It is one of four murals commissioned in 1927 by Omaha businessman Eugene Eppley for hotels in Council Bluffs, Cedar Rapids, Waterloo, and Sioux City. It was originally painted as a decoration for the Martin Hotel dining room in Sioux City. The mural was papered over in the early 1950s and forgotten until it was rediscovered in 1979 by Leah Hartman, an interviewer for the Siouxland Oral History Program. Her interview with Carl Eybers, Wood's assistant in painting the Martin Hotel mural, led to its being removed from the Hotel and conserved by the Sioux City Art Center. It is on permanent display in a special exhibition room.

Educational Program
Every year, the Sioux City Art Center offers approximately 100 classes for a range of ages from children to adults. These five- to ten-week courses include painting, drawing, printmaking, photography, ceramic, and sculpture as well as glass-works. In addition, each week The Saturday Art Lesson for children ages five through twelve offers two-hour, in-depth art lessons. Every Sunday, Family Fun Day offers special art projects for adults and children to create art together. Both classes are designed for drop-in attendance and students pay as they go.

The Sioux City Art Center has a series of annual programs throughout the year. The Youth Art Exhibition highlights artwork from area schools. The Sioux City Art Center's Artist in Residence Program is designed for high school students, while Summer ArtCamp includes 100 children aged five through twelve, and, in December, the Art Center has a series of free Holiday Gift Making Workshops. Occasionally there is also a Special Family Day accompanying our blockbuster exhibitions. Changing exhibitions in the Education Gallery, located in the Metz Education Wing on the second floor, highlight artwork created by Art Center students. The T. S. Martin Atrium is designed and decorated by the Education Department for various exhibitions, events and activities. The Art Center's Educational program also has community-requested classes and workshops such as the Artful Birthday Parties for children.

The Sioux City Art Center's Educational Program has a much wider range of community-oriented activities than just art classes. Along with the exhibitions at the Art Center, there is a Docent Program that includes 15 volunteers who give over 100 tours each year as part of the ARTWORKS Program for fifth-grade students. ARTWORKS includes all the fifth-grade students in the region. They receive free busing, a guided tour of the current exhibitions, and an opportunity to create a piece of art based on the art seen during their visit. The Art Center also offers a number of college internships that allow students to receive college credit for their volunteer work at the Art Center.

Museum Building

Size: . total

Exhibition Galleries: .

Educational Classrooms: .

In 1985, Margaret Ann Everist established a Building Endowment Fund, and the Art Center Association of Sioux City, led by William T. Dible, Dr. Frederick Stark and others, raised money specifically to build the current Sioux City Art Center. The new building would be more than three times the size of its former home, and cost 9.2 million dollars: $1 million was provided by the City, led by then-mayor Bob Scott, with the Association providing the remaining $8.2 million. Without her foresight and determination the new building would never have happened. Planning for the Sioux City Art Center building itself began in 1991, culminating in the ground-breaking ceremony at 225 Nebraska Street on August 24, 1994. Joseph Gonzalez of Skidmore, Owings and Merrill designed the museum, W.A. Klinger, Inc. of Sioux City was the general contractor who physically created it and Hubert H. Everist oversaw the details of the entire process.

The museum that came from Margaret Ann Everist's vision contains  of exhibition space, a 131-seat lecture hall, the Atrium Gift Gallery, the Junior League Hands On! Gallery, progressively designed classrooms, a fully equipped darkroom and ceramics studio, and an environmentally controlled vault for the housing and preservation of the Art Center's permanent collection.

After almost twelve years of fund-raising, planning and construction, the new Sioux City Art Center welcomed its patrons and public into the  building on March 1, 1997. In its first year, 80,000 visitors came to the new museum, tripling the number who had visited it in any previous year. In 2001, the Art Center received the Iowa Tourism Office and Travel Federation of Iowa's Tourism and the Arts Award.

In 1997, the Sioux City Art Center was named Cultural Attraction of the Year by the Iowa Division of Tourism, in 1998, it was named Arts Building Communities/Arts Organization of the Year by the Iowa Arts Council, and in 2000, the Omaha World Herald stated the new museum's opening was one of the ten most significant Art Events of the Decade in the Midwest.

References 

 Architectural Legacy exhibition

External links 
 Official website

Art museums and galleries in Iowa
Museums in Woodbury County, Iowa
Works Progress Administration in Iowa
Art museums established in 1938
1938 establishments in Iowa
Federal Art Project
Tourist attractions in Sioux City, Iowa
Buildings and structures in Sioux City, Iowa